1998 Emmy Awards may refer to:

 50th Primetime Emmy Awards, the 1998 Emmy Awards ceremony honoring primetime programming during June 1997 – May 1998
 25th Daytime Emmy Awards, the 1998 Emmy Awards ceremony honoring daytime programming during 1997
 26th International Emmy Awards, honoring international programming

Emmy Award ceremonies by year